Fever is the second album of American saxophonist Ronnie Laws released in 1976 by Blue Note Records. The album reached No. 13 on the Billboard Top Soul LPs chart.

Reception

The AllMusic review by Alex Henderson states, "Because Laws has recorded so many throwaways, one has to approach his catalog with caution; but rest assured that Fever puts his talent to work instead of wasting it".

Track listing
All compositions by Ronnie Laws except as indicated
 "Let's Keep It Together" - 4:30 
 "Fever" (Eddie Cooley, John Davenport) - 3:24 
 "All the Time" (William Jeffery) - 4:00 
 "Stay Still (And Let Me Love You)" (Margie Joseph, Arif Mardin) - 7:24 
 "Strugglin'" (W. Murray) - 4:08 
 "Captain Midnite" - 2:58 
 "Karmen" - 3:47 
 "Night Breeze" (Bobby Lyle) - 6:29 
 "From Ronnie with Love" - 4:22
Recorded at Total Experience Studios in Los Angeles, California between December 1975 and March 1976.

Personnel
Ronnie Laws - tenor saxophone, soprano saxophone, flute
Donald Hepburn, Michael Hepburn, Bobby Lyle -  electric piano, clavinet, synthesizer
Marlin the Magician - guitar
Wilton Felder, Nathaniel Phillips - electric bass
Bruce Carter, Steve Guttierez - drums
Bruce Smith - percussion
Tony Ben - conga
Murray Adler, Bonnie Douglas, Henry Ferber, Elliott Fisher, Ronald Folsom, James Getzoff, William Kurash, Joy Lyle, Gordon Marron, Paul C. Shure, Felix Sitjar, Carroll Stephens - violin
Jesse Ehrlich, Nathan Gershman, Raymond J. Kelley, Victor Sazer - vocals
Ronald Coleman, Augie Johnson, Esau Joyner, Michael Miller, Deborah Shotlow, Douglas Thomas - backing vocals

References

Blue Note Records albums
Ronnie Laws albums
1976 albums
1992 albums
Albums produced by George Butler (record producer)
Albums recorded at Total Experience Recording Studios
Reissue albums